The OFC U-16 Championship is a biennial football tournament for players under the age of 16. The tournament decides the only two qualification spots for the Oceania Football Confederation (OFC) and its representatives at the FIFA U-17 World Cup, which is held every two years.

Between 1983 and 2017, the tournament was open to teams under-17 years of age and was called the OFC U-17 Championship. Since 2018, the age limit was reduced to under 16 years of age, the tournament is called the OFC U-16 Championship.

Eligible teams
All member nations of the Oceania Football Confederation are allowed to enter a team. Teams that have participated in the tournament so far were:

 (member of AFC since 2007)
 (member of AFC since 1989)

Results
The list of winners:

U17 format
{| border=1 style="border-collapse:collapse; font-size:90%; text-align:center" cellpadding=3 cellspacing=0 width=100%
|- bgcolor=#C1D8FF
!rowspan=2 width=3%|Edition
!rowspan=2 width=5%|Year
!rowspan=2 width=10%|Host
!width=1% rowspan=35 bgcolor=ffffff|
!colspan=3|Final
!width=1% rowspan=35 bgcolor=ffffff|
!colspan=3|Third Place Match
|- bgcolor=#EFEFEF
!width=15%|Champion
!width=10%|Score
!width=15%|Second Place
!width=15%|Third Place
!width=10%|Score
!width=15%|Fourth Place
|- bgcolor=#F5FAFF
|1
|1983Details
|Auckland, New Zealand
|
|Round robin
|
|
|Round robin
|
|- bgcolor=#D0E7FF
|2
|1986
|Kaohsiung, Taiwan(Chinese Taipei)
|
|Round robin
|
|
|Round robin
|
|- bgcolor=#F5FAFF
|3
|1989
|Australia
|
|Round robin
|
|
|Round robin
|
|- bgcolor=#D0E7FF
|4
|1991Details
|Napier, New Zealand
|
|Round robin
|
|
|Round robin
|
|- bgcolor=#F5FAFF
|5
|1993
|New Zealand
|
|3–0
|
|
|unknown|
|- bgcolor=#D0E7FF
|6
|1995
|Vanuatu
|
|1–0
|
|
|3–0
|
|- bgcolor=#F5FAFF
|7
|1997
|New Zealand
|
|1–0
|
|
|3–0
|
|- bgcolor=#D0E7FF
|8
|1999
|Ba & Nadi, Fiji
|
|5–0
|
|
|unknown|
|- bgcolor=#F5FAFF
|9
|2001Details
|Apia, Samoa & Port Vila, Vanuatu
|
|3–0  6–0  (9–0)  two-legged match
|
|
|
|
|- bgcolor=#D0E7FF
|10
|2003Details
|Pago Pago, American Samoa, Sunshine Coast, Australia  & Nouméa, New Caledonia
|
|3–1  4–0  (7–1)  two-legged match
|
|
|
|
|- bgcolor=#F5FAFF
|11
|2005Details
|New Caledonia
|
|1–0
|
|
|3–1
|
|- bgcolor=#D0E7FF
|12
|2007Details
|Pirae, Tahiti
|
|Round robin
|
|
|Round robin
|
|- bgcolor=#F5FAFF
|13
|2009Details
|Auckland, New Zealand
|
|Round robin
|
|
|Round robin
|
|- bgcolor=#D0E7FF
|14
|2011Details
|Albany, New Zealand
|
|2–0
|
|
|2–0
|
|- bgcolor=#F5FAFF
|15
|2013Details
|Luganville, Vanuatu
|
|Round robin
|
|
|Round robin
|
|- bgcolor=#D0E7FF
|16
|2015Details
|Apia, Samoa & Pago Pago, American Samoa
|
|1–1  (5–4 pen.)
|
|
|6–0
|
|- bgcolor=#F5FAFF
|17
|2017Details
|Papeete, Tahiti
|
|7–0
|
|
|
|
|- bgcolor=#D0E7FF
|18
|2021Details
|TBC, Fiji
|colspan=3|Cancelled due to COVID-19 pandemic|colspan=3|
|- bgcolor=#F5FAFF
|19
|2023Details
|Suva & Ba, Fiji
|
|1–0
|
|
|3–0
|
|}

U16 format

U15 format

Notes

Performances by country

* = As hostsNote: no third or fourth place finishes in 1991 (no fourth place finish only), 2001, 2003 and 2017''.

Participating nations
Legend
1st – Champions
2nd – Runners-up
3rd – Third place
4th – Fourth place
SF – Semi-finalists
GS – Group stage
PR – Preliminary Round
 ×  – Did not participate
 ×  – Withdrew
     – Hosts
     – Not affiliated to OFC
Q – Qualified for upcoming tournament

Men's U-17 World Cup Qualifiers
Legend
1st – Champions
2nd – Runners-up
3rd – Third place
4th – Fourth place
QF – Quarterfinals
R2 – Round 2
R1 – Round 1
     – Hosts
     – Not affiliated to OFC
Q – Qualified for upcoming tournament

References

External links
OFC Official Website

 
Under-17 association football
Under